Matthew James Firth Coleman, better known by his stage name MJ Cole, is an English garage DJ, record producer and remixer.

Career
Born in London, England, in his youth, Cole was classically trained on the oboe and piano, and won scholarships to both the Royal College of Music Junior Department and City of London School.

Having graduated from City University, Cole began working at the drum and bass label SOUR, as a tape operator and sound engineer to the likes of Freq Nasty and Ed Rush. It was working on Ramsey & Fen's 2-step remixes for Kym Mazelle, however, that gave him the garage bug. He was the trusted engineer and lead producer of tracks on the UK garage label V.I.P. (Very Important Plastic) between 1997-1999 and a pirate radio DJ on London Underground FM, alongside the likes of the Dreem Teem.

From there, Cole penned and produced "Sincere" in 1998 using a sampler and Atari, which was eventually picked up by Pete Tong and AM:PM and became one of the earliest garage records to break into the top 40 on the UK Singles Chart.

He signed with Gilles Peterson's Talkin' Loud label where in 2000 he produced his first album, also called Sincere, which earned him two top 15 singles on the UK Singles Chart, a prestigious Mercury Music Prize nomination, Brit Award nomination and beat Dr. Dre to win MOBO's Best Producer award in 2001. He received a BPI certification for UK sales in excess of 60,000 copies. Cole formed a live band to accompany his Sincere album performing on Jools Holland's Later Show as well as on Top of the Pops, CD:UK, The Chart Show and at the Mercury Music Prize and MOBO Awards. In 2003, Cole followed Sincere with his Cut to the Chase album, also released via Talkin' Loud.

After leaving Talkin' Loud in 2004, Cole released several singles and EPs via his own Prolific Recordings label. Cole's output on the label has included many notable collaborations including grime artist Wiley and long-time collaborator Elisabeth Troy.

In 2014, he co-wrote and produced "Nobody But You" for Mary J. Blige with Sam Smith and Jimmy Napes, and again in early 2015 on Napes' own Making of Me EP. 

He collaborated with T Williams on "Privilege", released in 2015 on Today Records and Tomorrow Records and released "Bouldaz" on Disclosure's Method White label the same year.

Cole continued to produce for artists across the musical spectrum. Dizzee Rascal's "Bassline Junkie", Example's "Something in the Water" and Katy B's "Blue Eyes" were all produced by Cole. He has also remixed tracks for Amy Winehouse, Mariah Carey, De La Soul, Alicia Keys and many more. He released remixes of Jess Glynne's "Hold My Hand" on Atlantic and DJ Fresh and Adam F's "Believer" on Ministry of Sound.

He released "Alcatraz" on Redlight's Lobster Boy Records in early 2016. This was followed by "The Rumble" in August 2016. A hard hitting, genre crossing record featuring hotly tipped UK MC AJ Tracey. Cole said of the record that it was "a slice of London, the energy of now, a fusion of all that is exciting in the U.K. for us."

Through 2017 to 2018, Cole has been releasing a steady selection of singles under the 892 label, including "Pictures in My Head" and "Soak It Up". Some singles would also be accompanied by VIP mixes, also created by Cole. In 2018, he released a new EP entitled "Foundations", stating that the project "takes a step away from my more traditional form of writing".

Alongside his producing, writing and remixing work, Cole continues to tour as a DJ at festivals and clubs around the world. Cole has also written and produced scores for several major TV advertising campaigns including the Schwartz "The Sound of Taste" campaign and wrote a piece called "Lava" for O2. Cole was also responsible for the construction and design of a new recording studio complex in Clerkenwell called The Gin Factory.

Personal life
Cole enjoys cycling and has ridden Land's End to John o' Groats.

Discography

Albums

Extended plays

Singles
"Sincere" (1998) – featuring Nova Caspar and Jay Dee – UK No. 38
"Crazy Love" (2000) – featuring Elisabeth Troy – UK No. 10, BPI: Silver
"Sincere" (remix) (2000) – UK No. 13
"Hold On to Me" (2000) – featuring Elisabeth Troy – UK No. 35
"Wondering Why" (2003) – featuring Vula – UK No. 30
"Never Say Never" (2004) – featuring Shea
"When You Said You Loved Me" (2004) – featuring Tubby T 
"Badboy" (2006) – featuring Laura Vane
"Watertight" (2006) – featuring Laura Vane
"Gotta Have It" (2009) – featuring Digga
"From the Drop" (2010) – MJ Cole and Wiley
"Satellite" (2011)
"Red and Black" (2012)
"Bouldaz" (2015)
"Alcatraz" (2016)
"The Rumble" (2016) – MJ Cole and AJ Tracey
"Undo" (2017) - MJ Cole and Alyss
"Shelter" (2017) - MJ Cole and Bruno Major
"Interbass" (2017) - MJ Cole and DJ Zinc
"Pictures in My Head" (2017) 
"Soak It Up" (2018) - MJ Cole and Kojey Radical
"Homerton B" (remix) (2018) - MJ Cole and Unknown T
"Waking Up" (2019) – MJ Cole and Freya Ridings

Remixes
Flume - "Rushing Back" (MJ Cole Remix) (2019)
Gracey - "Gone" (MJ Cole Remix) (2020)
Disclosure, Kehlani & Syd - "Birthday" (MJ Cole Remix) (2020)

References

External links
 Prolific Recordings
 Archived website at Wayback Machine
 MJ Cole biography at the DJ List

Living people
English DJs
English record producers
Musicians from London
DJs from London
Remixers
UK garage musicians
Talkin' Loud artists
AM PM Records artists
Year of birth missing (living people)
Electronic dance music DJs